Canterbury College is an independent Anglican co-educational early learning, primary and secondary day school, located in Waterford, an outer suburb of Brisbane, between Beenleigh and  near Woodlands, in Queensland, Australia.

History 
Canterbury College was established in 1987, with seventy-three students in three classes in Years 6, 7 and 8. Student numbers have grown quickly and it now has an enrolment of 1,250 students, from Pre-Prep (Kindergarten) to Year Twelve.

Academic results
In 2013, 27 per cent of eligible Year 12 students received an OP 1 - 5 and 99 per cent of applying students received a placement and are currently studying at University. The College's Years 3, 5 and 7 students all achieved at or well above State and National averages in the 2014 NAPLAN testing.

School structure 
On-campus university programs are available and Year 12 students are able to study a university subject while at school. The College's Year 7 program has been established in Middle School since 2004.

See also 

 List of schools in Queensland
 List of Anglican schools in Australia

References

Anglican primary schools in Brisbane
Anglican high schools in Brisbane
1987 establishments in Australia
Educational institutions established in 1987
Logan City
The Associated Schools member schools